Radu IV the Great, (1467 – 23 April 1508) was a Voivode (Prince) of Wallachia from September 1495 to April 1508. He succeeded his father, Vlad Călugărul, who was one of the three brothers to Vlad III the Impaler. He was married to Princess Catalina Crnojević of Zeta (sometimes spelled as Katarina or Jekaterina), daughter of Andrija Crnojević. The marriage was arranged by her uncle Ivan Crnojević, Prince of Zeta after her father's death. Radu was succeeded by his first cousin Mihnea cel Rău, son to his uncle Vlad Țepeș.

Notes and references

|-

1508 deaths
Rulers of Wallachia
Year of birth unknown
1467 births
House of Drăculești
Burials at Dealu Monastery, Viforâta (Dâmboviţa County)
15th-century rulers in Europe
16th-century rulers in Europe